Nakanihon Air Service is a general aviation company headquartered in Toyoyama, Nishikasugai District, Aichi Prefecture, Japan, by Nagoya Airfield near Nagoya.

History 
In 1953, Nakanihon Air Service Co.,Ltd. (中日本航空株式会社 Nakanihon Kōkū Kabushiki Gaisha) (NAS) was founded near Nagoya Airport (currently Nagoya Airfield). Its major shareholders included Nagoya Railroad and ANA. Its core business has been general aviation, including scenic and charter flights, aerial photography and helicopter services. Its commuter operations were spun off as Nakanihon Airlines (NAL) in 1998 (renamed Air Central in 2005.)

Fleet
 20 fixed wing aircraft, including Cessna Citation V and Beechcraft King Air
 60 helicopters

References

External links

 Official website
 Official website 

Airlines of Japan
Airlines established in 1953
Companies based in Aichi Prefecture